Chesterton is a disused train station in Chesterton, Indiana. The current depot replaced a wooden structure built in 1852 for the Northern Indiana and Chicago Railroad, a predecessor road of the Lake Shore and Michigan Southern Railway, that burned down in 1913. It was rebuilt in 1914 as a brick structure.  By 1914, Cornelius Vanderbilt of the New York Central and Hudson River Railroad held a majority interest in the Lake Shore and Michigan Southern Railway. The Southern Railways trackage provided an ideal extension of the New York Central from Buffalo to Chicago. On December 22, 1914, the New York Central and Hudson River Railroad merged with the Lake Shore and Michigan Southern Railway to form a new New York Central Railroad.

The New York Central Railroad, built the new Chesterton Depot out of brick and to the west, across Fourth Street, they built a freight house that same year.

In 1968, the New York Central merged with the Pennsylvania Railroad. In 1976, the Penn Central's freight service was consolidated into Conrail and it ended passenger service altogether. Passenger service to Chesterton ended in 1959. The rail lines are currently operated by Norfolk Southern.

Architecture
The Passenger Depot is identified in the National Register as Bungalow/American Craftsman style, whereas the Indiana State Historic Office (SHP) and Historic Landmarks Foundation of Indiana identify the structure as Spanish Eclectic The Porter County Interim report also identifies the construction date as 1924. This contradiction with the National Register information may reflect a building upgrade in 1924. The adjacent freight house retains the bungalow/American Craftsman styling, which may be the original (pre-1921) style of the passenger depot.

According to the Indiana Office of Historic Preservation, attributes of the bungalow/American Craftsmap style are simple form, usually low side gable roof,
large porch, heavy brick piers or square tapered wood posts, overhanging eaves with simple knee braces, low pitched roof, natural materials, wood siding, brick, stucco, cobblestone. Attributes of Spanish Eclectic style are clay tile roofs, little or no overhanging eaves, stucco walls, arches, especially above doors, porch entries or primary windows, elaborate entryways, decorative ironwork.

National Register of Historic Sites
 Chesterton Commercial Historic District
 Chesterton Residential Historic District
 George Brown Mansion
 Norris and Harriet Coambs Lustron House
 New York Central Railroad Passenger Depot, Chesterton, Indiana
 Martin Young House

References

External links
Webcam of NS line

Railway stations on the National Register of Historic Places in Indiana
Buildings and structures completed in 1914
Transportation buildings and structures in Porter County, Indiana
Chesterton, Indiana
Railway stations in the United States opened in 1852
Railway stations closed in 1959
National Register of Historic Places in Porter County, Indiana
1852 establishments in Indiana
Railway stations in the United States opened in 1924
Former railway stations in Indiana